is a Japanese professional shogi player ranked 7-dan.

Promotion history
The promotion history for Ueno is as follows:
 6-kyū: 1984
 1-dan: 1989
 4-dan: October 1, 1995
 5-dan: January 26, 2001
 6-dan: July 1, 2008
 7-dan: April 1, 2022

References

External links
 ShogiHub: Matsumoto, Yoshiyuki

Japanese shogi players
Living people
Professional shogi players
Professional shogi players from Saitama Prefecture
1971 births